An Act further to protect the commerce of the United States, (5th Congress, Sess. 2, ch. 68) is an act of Congress approved July 9, 1798, authorizing the President of the United States to use military force in the Quasi-War with France.

Legislative history

On June 28, 1798, a committee appointed to consider President Adams' recommendations to Congress reported a bill further to protect the commerce of the United States which was received and read the first and second time. On July 2, 1798, the bill was amended and engrossed and the next day was read the third time, passed and sent to the Senate for concurrence.

On July 3, 1798, the Senate received the bill from the House and read it the first and second time. On July 6, 1798, the Senate passed the bill by a vote of 18 ayes and 4 nays. The bill was signed into law by President Adams on July 9, 1798.

References

External links

 , Complete text of the Act via Library of Congress
 Complete text of the Act, via Yale University

1798 in American law
Law of war
Quasi-War
History of the foreign relations of the United States
United States foreign relations legislation
5th United States Congress